Lucid 3-D was a spreadsheet package that began in the MS-DOS era; Windows support came later.

History
Sam Redman and Michael Stanford incorporated as PCSG corporation (Portable Computer Support Group).

Their Lucid 3-D spreadsheet was marketed by DAC.

Features
Lucid 3-D was considered noteworthy at the time for being "the only major memory-resident spreadsheet available for the PC."

The selling point of the product was being "three dimensional. Any cell of the spreadsheet can contain a complete other spreadsheet that you can access with a single keystroke."

Another technical feature was what their ads called "not only minimal recalc, but background recalc"

The Windows versions could display "up to nine overlapping spreadsheet windows."

File extension 
Data files were stored using the extension ".lcw" (Dot LCW).

See also
 Spreadsheet

References

Proprietary software